This is a list of federal hunting reserves in Switzerland. The first of the 41 game reserves were installed in the 19th century to limit excessive hunting (Federal Inventory of Federal Hunting Reserves).

Reserves

See also 
 Nature parks in Switzerland

References

External links
EUNIS: Switzerland - Federal Hunting Reserves (CH10), Common Database on Designated Areas (CDDA)
Schutzgebiete: Eidgenössische Jagdbanngebiete 

Hunting reserves
Hunting reserves
Switzerland
IUCN Category IV
Federal hunting reserves in Switzerland